Eric Scott Hinske (born August 5, 1977) is an American professional baseball coach and retired outfielder and first baseman who is currently the assistant hitting coach for the New York Mets of Major League Baseball (MLB). Hinske played in the major leagues from 2002 to 2013 with the Toronto Blue Jays, Boston Red Sox, Tampa Bay Rays, Pittsburgh Pirates, New York Yankees, Atlanta Braves and Arizona Diamondbacks at third base, first base, left field, and right field. He won the  AL Rookie of the Year Award with the Blue Jays. He has also been a coach for the Chicago Cubs and Los Angeles Angels.

Playing career

Early career
Born in Menasha, Wisconsin, Hinske played for Menasha High School where he broke many hitting records, in addition to playing football as a running back.  After graduating in 1995, he went on to play for the University of Arkansas. In 1997, he played collegiate summer baseball for the Hyannis Mets of the Cape Cod Baseball League.
 
Hinske was drafted by the Chicago Cubs in the 17th round of the 1998 amateur draft, and was traded to the Oakland Athletics for Miguel Cairo in March 2001.

Toronto Blue Jays
On December 7, 2001, Toronto Blue Jays general manager J.P. Ricciardi acquired Hinske and reliever Justin Miller from the Athletics for Billy Koch, a move designed to bring youth and vitality to the team.

Hinske was inserted in the everyday lineup in 2002, playing third base, and was a key contributor for the team, hitting predominantly in the second spot in the lineup. While criticized early for his sometimes shoddy defense, Hinske made up for his lapses with his bat, hitting 24 home runs, knocking in 84 runs, and scoring 99 runs. He is one of three rookies in Blue Jays history to hit 21 or more home runs, along with J.P. Arencibia (23 in 2011) and Rowdy Tellez (21 in 2019).  He also led all AL third basemen in errors, with 22. He received wide recognition, winning both the MLB Rookie of the Year and The Sporting News Rookie of the Year awards. While playing with the Jays, Bushnell had an advertisement in The Globe and Mail stating Eric Hinske eats fish tonight as the Jays were playing the Florida Marlins. This advertisement gave Hinske the nickname "The Big Fish".

Following Hinske's successful 2002 campaign, Ricciardi signed him to a five-year, $14.75 million contract in March 2003. Hinske slumped through the early part of the 2003 season before he was finally diagnosed with a broken hamate bone in his right hand, after he had played the beginning of the season with the fracture. As a result, he was unable to match his numbers of the previous year, finishing with an average of .243, 12 home runs and 63 RBI, Hinske finished fifth in the American League with 45 doubles.

Hinske was still unable to return to his rookie form in 2004, finishing the year with a batting average of .248, with 15 home runs and 69 RBI. A positive note for Hinske was that he had committed a career-low seven errors at third base, and he led all third baseman in fielding percentage, with a .978 mark.

After the 2004 season, the Blue Jays acquired Corey Koskie and Shea Hillenbrand, both third basemen, and Hinske was moved to first base for the 2005 season. He started strongly in 2005 with two home runs and 13 RBIs in his first eight games. Hinske finished April with four home runs and 17 RBIs, with a .289 average and a .482 slugging percentage. He finished the 2005 season with a .262 average, 15 home runs and 68 RBI, and a .430 slugging percentage.

With the acquisitions of Lyle Overbay and Troy Glaus by Toronto in the 2005 offseason, there was little room for Hinske as a corner infielder, and he was shifted once more to right field in a platoon with Alex Ríos for the 2006 season. Rios won the job after having a solid April.

Though Hinske's primary position in 2006 was right field, he had also seen some spot duty at first and third base, due to either injuries suffered by his teammates during the game or for pinch-hitting purposes.

On June 27, 2006, Rios was placed on the 15-day disabled list with a staph infection suffered after fouling a ball off his leg, thereby clearing the way for Hinske to see regular game action. In addition to Rios' injury, Hillenbrand's stormy departure from the team in July provided even more opportunity for increased playing time.

Hinske is also quoted in a July 25, 2006, column on the Blue Jays' official website, criticizing the departed Hillenbrand, who was designated for assignment for, among other things, complaining about his lack of playing time:

Boston Red Sox

On August 17, 2006, Hinske was traded to the Boston Red Sox for a minor league player to be named later and cash considerations. His versatility helped the Red Sox, since they were greatly plagued by injuries in the second half of the season. He ended the season with a 10-game hitting streak.

On May 17, 2007, Hinske had what could be his career highlight. In the 5th inning of a game against the Tigers, a ball was hit to right field (where Hinske was playing) and it appeared that the ball was out of reach. But he made a full-body diving catch, while also driving his face into the ground from the impact after making the catch. According to Red Sox color analyst, Jerry Remy, "Gosh, that's one of the best catches you'll see all season long (2007 season.) I didn't think he was gonna get to this." Later, in the bottom of the 7th inning, he would hit a home run into the Red Sox bullpen. Hinske hit below his career norms with a .204 batting average and a .733 OPS in the 115 games he appeared in with the Red Sox but received his first World Series ring with them in 2007.

Tampa Bay Rays

On February 6, 2008, Hinske signed a minor-league contract with an invitation to spring training with the Tampa Bay Rays. He was added to the 40-man major league roster on March 29, and was the Rays opening-day right-fielder. In his Rays debut, Hinske homered to right field off Baltimore starter Jeremy Guthrie. On July 29, Hinske hit his 100th career home run off former Toronto Blue Jays teammate Roy Halladay. There was controversy as to whether or not it was an inside the park home run. It was later officially ruled a traditional home run, after it was thought to have hit an awning in center field. On the final day of the regular season, Hinske hit his 20th home run, drove in his 60th run, and stole his 10th base of the year. It was the first time he had hit twenty home runs since his rookie year of 2002, and the first time he had stolen ten bases or more since the 2004 season.

Prior to game 4 of the World Series, Hinske was added to the Rays' roster, replacing the injured Cliff Floyd. In the fifth inning of Game 4, Hinske hit an estimated 410-foot pinch-hit home run to center field off Philadelphia starter Joe Blanton.

In Game 5 of the 2008 World Series against the Philadelphia Phillies, Hinske was the last batter struck out by Brad Lidge before the Rays lost the series.

Pittsburgh Pirates

On January 30, 2009, Hinske signed a one-year deal with the Pittsburgh Pirates worth $1.5 million.
He played 54 games for the team batting .255 while driving in 11 runs.

New York Yankees

In July, Hinske was traded from the Pirates to the New York Yankees in exchange for Eric Fryer and Casey Erickson. With New York he hit .226 with 7 home runs in 84 at-bats over 39 games. Hinske was included in the Yankees' postseason roster for the first round of the 2009 American League Division Series, and for the World Series. This marked his third straight World Series appearance with his third different team, all from the AL East. Additionally, the Yankees win gave him his second World Series ring.

Atlanta Braves

On January 5, 2010, it was reported that Hinske signed a one-year deal worth $1.5 million with the Atlanta Braves. In his first Braves at-bat he hit a triple. He hit his first home run as a Brave on May 16, 2010. Over the season, he appeared in 131 games, hitting .256 with 11 home runs and 51 RBI. He again made it to the postseason for the fourth straight year and hit a dramatic go-ahead, pinch-hit, two-run home run in the eighth inning of Game 3 of the NLDS against the San Francisco Giants, but the Braves ultimately lost that game and were eliminated in four games. On December 2, 2010, the Braves re-signed Hinske to a one-year deal with an option for 2012.

Hinske earned himself the nickname "Big Damage" during the early part of the 2011 season for his dramatic home runs and reckless abandon in his fielding. He is also occasionally called "Big Diesel" by Braves announcers. On June 3, 2011, Hinske hit a go-ahead solo homer off Mets closer Francisco Rodriguez to help the Braves win 6–3.

On May 11, 2012, Hinske was ejected by umpire Mike Muchlinski after Muchlinski ruled that Hinske had not checked his swing and was out on strikes.

Arizona Diamondbacks
According to a report on December 4, 2012, Hinske signed a one-year deal with the Arizona Diamondbacks. After passing a physical, the contract became official on December 6, 2012. On June 14, 2013, Hinske was suspended for five games for an aggressive action during a brawl between the Diamondbacks and the Los Angeles Dodgers on June 11. The suspension was later reduced to only one game. He was designated for assignment on June 28, 2013.

Scouting and coaching
Following the 2013 season, Hinske rejoined the Yankees, this time as a scout. He helped convince Brian McCann to sign with the Yankees. After a month as a Yankees' scout, Hinske was hired by the Chicago Cubs to be their first base coach on December 3, 2013.  On October 9, 2014, he took up the position of assistant hitting coach within the same organization. In 2016, Hinske won his third World Series ring when the Cubs defeated the Indians in the 2016 World Series in seven games. He was hired by the Los Angeles Angels on October 23, 2017, to be their hitting coach. After one season, he was replaced by Jeremy Reed. He was hired as the assistant hitting coach by the Arizona Diamondbacks in 2019. On June 10, 2021, Hinske was relieved of his position with the club. The New York Mets announced in January 2023 that Hinske was hired to be the team's assistant hitting coach for the 2023 season.

Personal life
Hinske was raised in Menasha, Wisconsin. He attended Menasha High School and played baseball, basketball and football for the Menasha Blue Jays, and lettered in all three sports. Hinske and wife Kathryn, have two daughters, Ava, who was born August 8, 2007, Dylan who was born February 9, 2010, and a son, Aiden Jase (A.J.) born October 31, 2013.

Hinske enjoys listening to metal music, and his walk-up song was "Walk" by Pantera. Hinske has a large set of tattoos incorporating Japanese iconography that completely cover his back.

References

External links

1977 births
Living people
American expatriate baseball players in Canada
Arkansas Razorbacks baseball players
Arizona Diamondbacks coaches
Arizona Diamondbacks players
Atlanta Braves players
Baseball coaches from Wisconsin
Baseball players from Wisconsin
Boston Red Sox players
Chicago Cubs coaches
Daytona Cubs players
Hyannis Harbor Hawks players
Iowa Cubs players
Los Angeles Angels coaches
Major League Baseball Rookie of the Year Award winners
Major League Baseball first base coaches
Major League Baseball first basemen
Major League Baseball hitting coaches
Major League Baseball third basemen
New York Yankees players
New York Yankees scouts
People from Menasha, Wisconsin
Pittsburgh Pirates players
Reno Aces players
Rockford Cubbies players
Sacramento River Cats players
Syracuse SkyChiefs players
Tampa Bay Rays players
Toronto Blue Jays players
West Tennessee Diamond Jaxx players
Williamsport Cubs players
Anchorage Glacier Pilots players